854 Naval Air Squadron was a squadron of the Royal Navy's Fleet Air Arm, first formed on 1 January 1944 at Squantum Naval Air Station in the United States. It was disbanded in December 1945, and reformed December 2006 as a helicopter squadron designed for Airborne Surveillance and Control.

History 
The squadron was formed during the Second World War in January 1944 equipped with Grumman Avenger IIs to operate as an anti-shipping squadron. In May 1944, it arrived back in the United Kingdom, to become part of No.157 Wing, RAF Coastal Command. It operated over the English Channel to carry out anti-shipping patrols in the run-up to the D-Day Allied invasion of Europe. It left for the Far East in September 1944. The squadron carried out operations on board aircraft carrier  against Sumatra in December and January 1945. In March and April the squadron attacked targets on the Sakishima Islands. 854 NAS received new Avenger IIIs in July to join the 3rd Carrier Air Group. But shortly afterwards 854 left its Avenger IIIs behind and sailed for the UK, to disband after the war on 8 December 1945.

After a ceremony on 13 December 2006 at RNAS Culdrose, the unit reformed with the Westland Sea King ASaC.7, previously A Flight, 849 Squadron. From March to July 2007 the squadron carried out counter-drug operations on board HMS Ocean, and helped to seize a tonne of cocaine.

References
Sturtivant and Ballance (1994), The Squadrons of the Fleet Air Arm, Air Britain Publications, 480pp, .

External links
 Royal Navy 854 Naval Air Squadron

854
Military units and formations established in 1944
Military units and formations in Massachusetts
Military of the United Kingdom in Cornwall